SM UC-97 was a German Type UC III minelaying submarine or U-boat in the German Imperial Navy during World War I.

Design
A German Type UC III submarine, UC-97 had a displacement of  when at the surface and  while submerged. The submarine was powered by two six-cylinder four-stroke diesel engines each producing  (a total of ), two electric motors producing , and two propeller shafts.

UC-97 was fitted with six  mine tubes, fourteen UC 200 mines, three  torpedo tubes (one on the stern and two on the bow), seven torpedoes, and one  SK L/45 or  Uk L/30 deck gun . Her complement was twenty-six crew members.

Construction 
The U-boat was ordered on 12 January 1916 and was launched on 17 March 1918. She was commissioned into the German Imperial Navy on 3 September 1918 as SM UC-97. As with the rest of the completed UC III boats, UC-97 conducted no war patrols and sank no ships.

United States Navy 
She was surrendered on 22 November 1918 to the United States. Twelve United States Navy officers with 120 enlisted men were sent to England to sail the captured submarines of this expeditionary force across the Atlantic to be exhibited in the United States raising money for Liberty Bonds. UC-97 sailed from Harwich in April 1919 with U-111, U-164, and UB-88. UC-97 sailed through the St. Lawrence Seaway to the Great Lakes under the command of Charles A. Lockwood. LCDR Lockwood spent the summer of 1919 coordinating port calls with mayors of cities on lakes Ontario, Erie, Huron, and Michigan. By late August, the submarine's unfamiliar German machinery was no longer responding reliably to Lockwood's crew. The commandant of the 9th Naval District assumed control of UC-97 as Lockwood with his crew left to assume command of  being built at Bridgeport, Connecticut. UC-97 was moored at the foot of Monroe Street and opened to tourists in Chicago's lakefront Grant Park.

Destruction 
A clause of the armistice treaty required all German combat vessels held by Allied forces to be destroyed before 1 July 1921. The wreck of UC-97 has not been definitively located. It has been reported in a 2013 Toronto Star article that the U-boat was found in 1992 by the Chicago-based company A and T Recovery.

References

Notes

Citations

Bibliography

External links 
 German World War I U-boat UC-97  from A&T Recovery, locaters of UC-97s wreck in Lake Michigan
 WWI German submarine has underwater Lake Michigan grave ABC Chicago article May 19, 2013

Ships built in Hamburg
German Type UC III submarines
U-boats commissioned in 1918
World War I submarines of Germany
World War I minelayers of Germany
1918 ships
Ships sunk as targets
Maritime incidents in 1921
Shipwrecks of Lake Michigan